Horodok (Cyrillic: Городок) is a Ukrainian name for small city.

Horodok may refer to:

Populated places
There are some eight villages in Ukraine under such name, predominantly in Volhynia. Some other village in Chernihiv Oblast was delisted in 2005 due to being abandoned.

Cities
Horodok, Khmelnytskyi Oblast, Ukraine
Horodok, Lviv Oblast, Ukraine

Urban-type settlements
Horodok, Zhytomyr Oblast

Villages
Horodok, Rivne Raion
Horodok, Zalishchyky Raion

Military installations
Horodok (air base), near the city of Horodok, Lviv Oblast

See also
Gorodok (disambiguation)
Haradok, a town in Vitebsk Region, Belarus
Gord (archaeology)
Battle of Horodok